Saint-André-sur-Cailly (literally Saint-André on Cailly) is a commune in the Seine-Maritime department in the Normandy region in northern France.

Geography
The A28 autoroute runs through the commune's territory.

Population

Places of interest
 The church of St. André, dating from the eleventh century.
 The ruins of a Roman amphitheatre at the hamlet of Bout Levé.
 Three châteaux.
 A sixteenth-century stone cross in the cemetery.

See also
Communes of the Seine-Maritime department

References

Communes of Seine-Maritime